Jonathan Stark and Kevin Ullyett were the defending champions and won in the final 6–1, 6–4 against Leoš Friedl and Radek Štěpánek.

Seeds
Champion seeds are indicated in bold text while text in italics indicates the round in which those seeds were eliminated.

 Chris Haggard /  Tom Vanhoudt (quarterfinals)
 Pablo Albano /  Martín García (first round)
 Dominik Hrbatý /  Scott Humphries (quarterfinals)
 Thomas Shimada /  Myles Wakefield (first round)

Draw

External links
 2001 Hamlet Cup Doubles Draw

Connecticut Open (tennis)
2001 ATP Tour